Till is a 2022 biographical drama film directed by Chinonye Chukwu and written by Michael Reilly, Keith Beauchamp, and Chukwu, and produced by Beauchamp, Reilly, and Whoopi Goldberg. It is based on the true story of Mamie Till-Bradley, an educator and activist who pursued justice after the murder of her 14-year-old son Emmett in August 1955. The film stars Danielle Deadwyler as Mamie and Jalyn Hall as Emmett. Kevin Carroll, Frankie Faison, Haley Bennett, Jayme Lawson, Tosin Cole, Sean Patrick Thomas, John Douglas Thompson, Roger Guenveur Smith, and Goldberg also appear in supporting roles.

The film was officially announced in August 2020, though a project about Emmett Till's murder had been in the works for several years prior. Much of the main cast joined the following summer, and filming took place in Bartow County, Georgia that fall. It is the second major media property based on Mamie Till to be released in 2022, following the television series Women of the Movement. The film is dedicated in memory of Mamie Till's life and legacy and its release coincided with the October 2022 unveiling of a statue in Emmett Till's memory in Greenwood, Mississippi.

Till had its world premiere at the New York Film Festival on October 1, 2022, was theatrically released in the United States on October 14, 2022, by United Artists Releasing, and was released in the United Kingdom on January 6, 2023, by Universal Pictures. The film received positive reviews, with Deadwyler's performance garnering widespread acclaim, and was named one of the best films of 2022 by the National Board of Review. It has grossed $11 million against a production budget of $20 million.

Plot

In August 1955, Emmett Till lives with his mother Mamie and maternal grandmother Alma Carthan in Chicago. Before leaving to meet with his relatives in Money, Mississippi, Mamie warns Emmett to be extra careful around white people. At a train station, the Tills meet with Mamie's uncle, Mose "Preacher" Wright, and his cousin Wheeler Parker. After picking cotton on a sharecropper plantation, Emmett and his cousins purchase candy at the Bryant's Grocery and Meat Market. At the cash register, Emmett tells Carolyn Bryant that she looks like a movie star before showing her a photograph of a white girl in his wallet. Carolyn follows Emmett outside of the store, to which he whistles at her. Disgusted, Carolyn retrieves a pistol from her vehicle as Till and his relatives flee from the store. 

In the early hours of August 28, Carolyn's husband Roy and his half-brother John William "J. W." Milam arrive at Wright's house and force themselves inside. They locate Till inside of the bedrooms and force him to put on his clothes before kidnapping him. Till's great-aunt offers the men money, but Milam refuses. Before leaving, Milam holds Wright at gunpoint. Inside one of the other vehicles, Carolyn identifies Till and the Bryants drive off. Emmett is then savagely beaten, shot dead, and thrown into the Tallahatchie River.

Back in Chicago, Mamie is informed of her son's kidnapping. Her cousin Rayfield Mooty arranges her to meet with William Huff, the counsel for the NAACP chapter in Chicago. At his office, Huff inquires about Mamie's past marriages as her personal history will be questioned. Meanwhile, the police locate Till's corpse along the river. Upon hearing the news, Mamie collapses in shock. Despite Mooty's reservations, Mamie asks for her son's body to be transferred back to Chicago. Shortly after, Emmett's coffin arrives on train, to which Mamie cries in pain. After seeing her son's mutilated corpse on an autopsy table, Mamie has her son's coffin be left open to demonstrate what had been done to him. Emmett's killing and funeral garners national headlines across the United States. 

Roy Bryant and J.W. Milam are charged for their actions in relation to Till's killing. Accompanied with her father, Mamie travels to Mound Bayou to help represent her son for the trial. At the Regional Council headed by T. R. M. Howard, he asks Mamie to consider her future after the trial as her activism can help galvanize federal support for voting rights towards Black Americans. On the first day of the trial, the defense team requests a recess after learning of another witness, to which the judge agrees and adjourns. 

During the recess, the prosecution locates Willie Reed, who was an eyewitness to Till's killing. On the next day, Wright and Reed give their testimonies, the former of whom identifies Milam as the culprit who held his family at gunpoint. Next, Mamie goes before the trial, testifying she could identify the corpse as her son. The defense then cross-examines Mamie, as she had told the "colored press" she warned Emmett on how to conduct himself in Mississippi. Later, on the witness stand, Carolyn Bryant testifies that Emmett made sexual advances towards her. Angered, Mamie leaves the courtroom assured that she already knows the verdict. 

After about a hour, the jury finds Roy Bryant and J.W. Milam not guilty of Till's killing. A month later, at a NAACP rally in Harlem, Mamie criticizes the Mississippi criminal justice system for victim blaming and the United States for failing in its promise for equal justice. She returns home and fondly remembers Emmett as she imagines him in his room.

Cast
 Danielle Deadwyler as Mamie Till
 Jalyn Hall as Emmett Till, Mamie's deceased son.
 Kevin Carroll as Rayfield Mooty, a member of Civil Rights activism organization NAACP.
 Frankie Faison as John Carthan, Mamie's father and Emmett's grandfather.
 Haley Bennett as Carolyn Bryant, a Southern shopkeeper whose accusations led to Emmett's murder.
 Jayme Lawson as Myrlie Evers, an NAACP member and Medgar's wife.
 Tosin Cole as Medgar Evers, an NAACP member and Myrlie's husband.
 Sean Patrick Thomas as Gene Mobley, Mamie's boyfriend and eventual husband.
 John Douglas Thompson as Mose "Preacher" Wright, Emmett's uncle and Elizabeth's husband.
 Roger Guenveur Smith as T.R.M. Howard, the head of the Regional Council.
 Whoopi Goldberg as Alma Carthan, Mamie's mother and Emmett's grandmother.
 Keisha Tillis as Elizabeth Wright, Emmett's aunt and Mose's wife.
 Marc Collins as Wheeler Parker, Emmett's cousin.
 Diallo Thompson as Maurice, Emmett's cousin.
 Tyrik Johnson as Simmy, Emmet's youngest cousin.
 Keith Arthur Bolden as William Huff, the leader of the NAACP chapter in Chicago.
 Darian Rolle as Willie Reed, a black man who was an eyewitness to Emmett's murder.
 Sean Michael Weber as Roy Bryant, Carolyn's husband and one of the men who murdered Emmett.
 Eric Whitten as John William "J.W." Milam, one of the men who murdered Emmett.

Production

On August 27, 2020, it was announced that Chinonye Chukwu would write and direct a feature film based on the life of Mamie Till-Mobley and her fight for justice after the lynching of her 14-year-son, Emmett Till. Produced by Orion Pictures, the film uses 27 years' worth of research by Keith Beauchamp, whose efforts led to the reopening of Till's case by the United States Department of Justice in 2004. Simeon Wright, Till's cousin and an eyewitness of the event, served as a consultant to the project until his death in 2017. Chukwu's screenplay is based on a draft she previously co-wrote with Beauchamp and producer Michael Reilly. In July 2021, Danielle Deadwyler and Whoopi Goldberg joined the cast. Jalyn Hall was cast as Emmett Till that August. Filming began in Bartow County, Georgia, in September 2021. By the end of the year, Frankie Faison, Jayme Lawson, Tosin Cole, Kevin Carroll, Sean Patrick Thomas, John Douglas Thompson, Roger Guenveur Smith, and Haley Bennett were confirmed to star.

During post-production, the musical score was composed by Abel Korzeniowski.

Release
The film received a limited release in the United States on October 14, 2022 and Canada on October 21, 2022, before a wide release on October 28, 2022, by United Artists Releasing under the Orion Pictures label. Outside of the US, it was distributed by Universal Pictures, including its release in the United Kingdom on January 6, 2023. The film premiered at the New York Film Festival on October 1, 2022, and was screened at the London Film Festival on October 15, 2022, and at the 31st Philadelphia Film Festival that same month. The distributor also invited high school students to special screenings of the film in New York's Alice Tully Hall; showings of the film and questionnaires with the filmmakers were simultaneously shared online. The film was also screened for US President and First Lady Joe and Jill Biden at the White House in Washington, D.C. on February 16, 2023.

Till is the second last film by United Artists Releasing under the banner of Orion Pictures, following the shutdown of the predecessor company by Amazon Studios due to the lack of box office like Bones and All and Women Talking (also being the last film) as a result of general public no longer supporting prestige films released during the late-2022 awards season period, and the decision of the Amazon Studios' Air  in theatres in 2023 following the 96th Academy Awards buzz. Women Talking is also a last film following the Amazon's acquisition of Orion Pictures.

The film was released for VOD platforms on November 22, 2022, followed by a Blu-ray and DVD release on January 17, 2023.

Reception

Box office 
In the United States and Canada, the film made $242,269 from 16 theaters in its opening weekend. It held this record as the highest platform release opening of the year until The Whale two months later. In its second weekend the film made $363,541 from 104 theaters. Expanding to 2,058 theaters in its third weekend, the film made $1.03 million on its first day and would go on to gross $2.7 million over the weekend, finishing sixth. In its second weekend of wide release the film made $1.88 million (marking a drop of 32%). Variety attributed these results to the general public showing the early stages of refusal to see and support prestige films in theaters in a moviegoing environment altered by the COVID-19 pandemic, along with the possibility that the film's subject matter may have been seen as uncomfortable for audiences to handle.

Critical response 

  Audiences polled by CinemaScore gave the film a rare average grade of "A+", and those at PostTrak gave the film a 91% overall positive score, with 87% saying they definitely would recommend it.

Michael O'Sullivan of The Washington Post gave the film four complete stars, writing: "It's Deadwyler who holds our attention — our gaze and our hearts — and who does so with a masterful control. Even at Mamie's most shattered, an inextinguishable ember of courage and purpose seems to smolder at the core of the character." Peter Travers of ABC News felt Till "is more than a movie -- it's essential viewing." He further praised Deadwyler's performance, writing she "is too good to let a movie turn Black trauma into cheesy Oscar bait. Even when the film lets conventional biopic tropes mess with momentum, Deadwyler never loses her uncanny connection to the female warrior she's playing." Manohla Dargis of The New York Times highlighted Chukwa's fixed focus on Mamie Till, to which she also praised Deadwyler for "delivering a quiet, centralizing performance that works contrapuntally with the story's heaviness, its profundity and violence."
 
Michael Phillips of the Chicago Tribune also noted Chukwa's direction and Deadwyler's performance, but felt more screen time was needed to justify "Mamie's transformation from relatively apolitical Chicagoan to an urgently engaged citizen of a wider world." Richard Brody of The New Yorker stated the film "is a work of mighty cinematic portraiture, with a range of closeups of Mamie that infuse the film with an overwhelming combination of subjective depth and an outward sense of purpose. These images depend for that vast spectrum of feeling upon Deadwyler's performance, one of the most radiantly, resonantly expressive to grace the screen this year." Brian Lowry of CNN felt there's "a difficult-to-avoid aspect to the production that can't entirely escape a movie-of-the-week feel," but nevertheless wrote: "Anchored by Danielle Deadwyler's towering performance, it's a wrenching portrayal of reluctant heroism under the most horrific of parental circumstances." 

Peter Debruge of Variety wrote: "It would take a tough constitution not to be moved by Till, although that doesn't necessarily make it great drama ... Chukwu's first wish is clearly not to re-victimize Emmett Till, but in eliding such details and avoiding the torture, Chukwu relies perhaps too much on our imagination." Kate Erbland, reviewing on the website Indiewire, gave the film a mixed response: "While Deadwyler turns in a remarkable performance as Mamie, beautifully calibrating her love and anger in one riveting package, the rest of Till is prone to trope-ridden, predictable sequences that do little to advance her story or Emmett's legacy."

Accolades

Despite receiving nominations in several other ceremonies, Deadwyler was controversially not nominated for an Best Actress at the 95th Academy Awards, prompting Chukwu to criticise the film industry for "upholding whiteness and perpetuating an unabashed misogyny towards Black women". In the wake of this decision, widely considered a snub, film critic Robert Daniels of the Los Angeles Times lamented on how the film industry at large fails Black women, with the lack of a nomination for Deadwyler or Viola Davis in The Woman King serving to exemplify this.

 — Shared with Gabriel LaBelle for The Fabelmans.

See also
 Emmett Till
 1956 Sugar Bowl
 Civil rights movement
 Civil rights movement in popular culture
 Women of the Movement, television series also released in 2022

References

External links
 

2022 biographical drama films
2022 independent films
2020s English-language films
American biographical drama films
British biographical drama films
Canadian biographical drama films
Civil rights movement in film
Emmett Till in fiction
Films about activists
Films about racism in the United States
Films impacted by the COVID-19 pandemic
Films produced by Barbara Broccoli
Films set in 1955
Films shot in Atlanta
Films about mother–son relationships
Orion Pictures films
2020s American films